Quetcy Lozada is an American politician who represents the 7th Councilmanic District on the Philadelphia City Council since 2022.

Career 
Lozada served as the Chief of Staff to Maria Quiñones-Sánchez. When Quinones-Sanchez resigned to run for Mayor, Lozada was nominated by the Ward Leaders in the 7th District over Angel Cruz for the special election nomination. She won the general election on November 8, 2022. She will represent Kensington, Feltonville, Juniata Park, and Frankford on the council.

References 

1970 births
Living people
Philadelphia City Council members
Pennsylvania Democrats